Chilecito is a department of the province of La Rioja (Argentina).

Settlements 

 Anguinán
 Chilecito
 Colonia Catinzaco
 Guanchín
 Los Sarmientos
 Malligasta
 Nonogasta
 San Miguel
 Sañogasta
 Santa Florentina
 Tilimuqui
 Vichigasta

References 

Departments of La Rioja Province, Argentina